British Rail Class D2/7 was a locomotive commissioned by British Rail in England. It was a diesel powered locomotive in the pre-TOPS period built by Hudswell Clarke with a Gardner engine.  The mechanical transmission, using a scoop control fluid coupling and three-speed Power-flow SSS (synchro-self-shifting) gearbox, was a Hudswell Clarke speciality.

Appearance
The D2/7 was of old-fashioned appearance with a full-height engine casing and a small, steam locomotive-type chimney.  The later British Rail Class D2/12, although mechanically similar, was of more modern appearance.

Preservation 
One locomotive was originally preserved after withdrawal but was then scrapped in C F Booths, Rotherham in 2005.

Modelling
A kit is available from Invertrain  in 7 mm Scale (O Gauge)

Mercian Models  make kits for this locomotive and the very similar industrial version, in both 4 mm and 7 mm scale.

See also

 List of British Rail classes

References

Sources

 Ian Allan ABC of British Railways Locomotives, winter 1962/3 edition, page 199

D002.07
Hudswell Clarke locomotives
C locomotives
Railway locomotives introduced in 1955
Scrapped locomotives
Standard gauge locomotives of Great Britain